Arnold Frank Stickley (18 February 1926 – 31 December 1998) was an English professional golfer. He finished tied for 11th place in the 1959 Open Championship, having been joint leader with Fred Bullock after a first round 68.

Stickley won the PGA Close Championship in 1960. Mist on the opening morning meant that, with 162 competitors, the opening round could not be completed. The second round was reduced to nine holes to allow it to be completed on the second day. Stickley won a first prize of £275, the Slazenger Trophy, and a special award of £100.

Tournament wins
1960 PGA Close Championship

Results in major championships

Note: Stickley only played in The Open Championship.

CUT = missed the half-way cut
"T" indicates a tie for a place

References

External links

English male golfers
1926 births
1998 deaths